= Coastland University =

University in California, United States

Coordinates: 33°28′04″N 117°41′55″W

Coastland University crest

Coastland University (also known as Coastland Christian Bible College and University) is an unaccredited, non-denominational, non-profit, co-educational Christian Bible college located in Southern California, United States. It uses classroom space at area churches and other venues rather than a dedicated campus. It began holding classes in 1999.

The physical address of the university/ministry is Rancho Santa Margarita, California, 92688. The university's president is Dr. Brett Peterson, who has been a minister, a pastor, and a professor.

Coastland has several degree options available, including biblical studies, divinity, pastoral care and counseling, and theology. Coastland's degrees are not accredited by any organization.

Coastland has an articulation agreement with Liberty University, so many of their classes will transfer to them. They went through the accreditation process with the Association of Higher Biblical Education, but they required a librarian and 30,000 books and Coastland decided not to pursue accreditation.
